In 2007, the United States Mint released a silver dollar commemorative coin which commemorates the 400th year after the founding of Jamestown. Surcharges from the sale of the Jamestown commemorative were donated to Jamestown-Yorktown Foundation of the Commonwealth of Virginia, the Secretary of the Interior and the Association for the Preservation of Virginia Antiquities to support programs that promote the understanding of the legacies of Jamestown.

The coin is being sold as both as a proof coin and an uncirculated coin, with a maximum coinage of 500,000 coins.
The coins only mintmark is P, for the Philadelphia mint.

Features
Coin Finishes: proof, and uncirculated
Maximum Mintage: 500,000
U.S. Mint Facility: Philadelphia Mint (P)

value(currently):$0.0–$255

See also
 
 
 United States commemorative coins
 List of United States commemorative coins and medals (2000s)
 Jamestown 400th Anniversary half eagle

References

Modern United States commemorative coins
Native Americans on coins
Ships on coins
United States silver coins